The Makhamra family, also Muhamra or Mahmara, is an extended family from the Palestinian city of Yatta, in the Hebron Governorate, West Bank. It is one of the largest clans in the southern Hebron Hills. In Palestinian Arabic, the meaning of Makhamra is "winemakers", an act forbidden in Islam according to a common interpretation.

The Makhamra family has a tradition of descending from a Jewish Arab tribe from Khaybar who was expelled from the Arabian Peninsula. Yitzhak Ben-Zvi, a historian who later became the second President of Israel, visited Yatta during the 1920s and interviewed the village's mukhtar, 'Ibn Aram. Ben-Zvi later wrote that the ancestor of three of the six clans that make up the village was Muheimar, a Jew who came up from the desert with his tribe and conquered the village, probably in the second half of the 18th century. Davar reported in 1929 that members of the "Land of Israel Wandering Association" met with members of the family who confirmed their Jewish ancestry from Khaybar, "maybe 700 years ago". Several of them claimed they would not eat camel meat, which is forbidden in Judaism.

In 1938, Arab families from Yatta were reported to celebrate the Jewish holiday of Hanukkah, lighting candles retrieved from the Jewish community of Hebron.

Several members of the Makhamra clan were interviewed for a Channel 1 article about Tzvi Misinai, a former high-tech entrepreneur, and admitted that they are aware of their Jewish origins, although today they consider themselves Muslims for many generations since their ancestors converted to Islam. Members of the clan are today reluctant to acknowledge their Jewish heritage, probably due to the fear that Israel will use that to support its claim for ownership over the land.

Recently, Makhamra clan members has been linked to Palestinian terrorism. On June 8, 2016, two members of the clan, Khaled Mahmara and Muhammad Mahamara, carried out a shooting attack in Sarona Market, Tel Aviv, during which they killed four people. Some writers have attributed that activity to their desire to show their neighbors that despite their "Jewish past", they are sided with the Palestinians in the Israeli–Palestinian conflict.

References 

Arabic-language surnames
Palestinian families
Palestinian people of Jewish descent